Clavus virginieae is a species of sea snail, a marine gastropod mollusc in the family Drilliidae.

Description

Distribution
This is a marine species occurs off New Caledonia and the Loyalty Islands.

References

External links
  Kilburn R.N., Fedosov A. & Kantor Yu.I. (2014) The shallow-water New Caledonia Drilliidae of genus Clavus Montfort, 1810 (Mollusca: Gastropoda: Conoidea). Zootaxa 3818(1): 1-69

virginieae
Gastropods described in 2014